The Beatles EP Collection is a box set of vinyl records by the English rock band the Beatles. It was released by EMI's Parlophone record label in the United Kingdom on 7 December 1981. The box set consists of thirteen of the band's extended play (EP) releases from 1963 to 1967, including the double EP Magical Mystery Tour, and a new disc, titled The Beatles, which compiled previously unavailable stereo mixes of four songs. Released with the Parlophone catalogue number BEP 14, the box set was the third in a series of format-based sets in the UK, after The Singles Collection 1962–1970 (1976) and The Beatles Collection (1978).

As with the 1978 collection, the set is packaged in a dark blue box, with gold lettering used for the compilation title and the four band members' signatures. All of the 1960s EPs are presented in their original sleeve designs, while The Beatles uses the artwork from the band's 1967 double A-side single "Strawberry Fields Forever" / "Penny Lane".
 
The four songs on the new EP (Parlophone SGE 1) are "The Inner Light", "Baby, You're a Rich Man", "She's a Woman" and "This Boy". In the case of "Baby, You're a Rich Man", the EP served as the debut UK release for the true stereo version of the track, which had previously been available only in mono or duophonic ("mock stereo") sound. Due to an error in the manufacturing process for The Beatles EP Collection, "This Boy" was originally issued in mono.

Box-set contents
Disc numbers and titles per Kenneth Womack's The Beatles Encyclopedia.

References

1981 compilation albums
The Beatles compilation albums
Parlophone compilation albums
Reissue albums